Analgecine (brand name AGC) is an analgesic extract that is approved for the treatment of back pain and neuralgia in China.

References

External links
 Analgecine - AdisInsight
 Analgecine - Vanway

Analgesics